Majestic Hotel Cellars (French: Les caves du Majestic) is a 1945 French mystery film directed by Richard Pottier and starring Albert Préjean, Suzy Prim and Denise Grey. It is based on the Maigret novel Maigret and the Hotel Majestic by Georges Simenon.

The film's sets were designed by the art director Guy de Gastyne.

The film earned admissions in France of 1,870,814.  It was the last production of the German-controlled French film production company Continental Films, which was dissolved after the Liberation of Paris.

Cast
 Albert Préjean as Le commissaire Jules Maigret 
 Suzy Prim as Émilie Petersen 
 Jacques Baumer as Arthur Donge 
 Denise Grey as Madame Van Bell 
 Jean Marchat as Fred Petersen 
 André Gabriello as L'inspecteur Lucas 
 Gina Manès as Ginette, la femme de service 
 René Génin as Ramuel 
 Florelle as Charlotte Donge 
 Fernand Charpin as Le juge d'instruction 
 Denise Bosc as Hélène Donnegan, la secrétaire des Petersen 
 Gabrielle Fontan as Rosalie, la bonne de Fualdès 
 Georges Chamarat as Dussart, le veilleur de nuit du Majestic 
 Marcel Lévesque as Le directeur de l'Agence Internationale 
 Jean-Jacques Delbo as Enrico Fualdès 
 Raymond Rognoni as Le directeur du Majestic 
 Robert Demorget as Le petit Teddy Petersen

References

Bibliography
 Goble, Alan. The Complete Index to Literary Sources in Film. Walter de Gruyter, 1999.

External links

1945 films
Police detective films
Maigret films
Films directed by Richard Pottier
French mystery films
1945 mystery films
1940s French-language films
Films set in Paris
French black-and-white films
1940s police procedural films
Continental Films films
1940s French films